Ronald Gordon King-Smith OBE (27 March 1922 – 4 January 2011), was an English writer of children's books, primarily using the pen name Dick King-Smith. He is best known for The Sheep-Pig (1983). It was adapted as the movie Babe (1995) and translations have been published in fifteen languages. He was awarded an Honorary Master of Education degree by the University of the West of England in 1999 and appointed Officer of the Order of the British Empire (OBE) in the 2010 New Year Honours.

Early life, military service
King-Smith was born on 27 March 1922 in Bitton, Gloucestershire and grew up in the West Country, his father was Captain Ronald King-Smith DSO MC, who ran several paper mills. King-Smith was educated at Beaudesert Park School and Marlborough College. He was a soldier in World War II, serving with the Grenadier Guards in Italy, and a farmer for 20 years before he became a teacher at Farmborough Primary School and author. King-Smith's first book was The Fox Busters, published in 1978 while he was living and teaching in Farmborough.

In 1941, at the age of 19, King-Smith enlisted as a recruit in the Grenadier Guards. As a young platoon commander in 1943, he took part in the Salerno Landings in Italy. On arrival in Salerno, his platoon fought their way up Italy, along with many others, which took months. On 12 July 1944, King-Smith was seriously injured by a British hand grenade thrown by a German soldier. He was only saved from certain death because he was sheltering behind a tree, which took the brunt of the explosion. He suffered extensive sharp wounds, and later, when he was back in England, a cerebral embolism, either of which could have killed him.

Personal life
King-Smith met his wife, Myrle on Christmas Day 1936. They were both 14. They were married at St. Mary's Church, Bitton, on February 6 1943. They had three children: Juliet, Giles and Liz. Myrle died in 2000, and King-Smith subsequently married Zona Bedding, a family friend. He presented a feature on animals on TV-AM's children's programme Rub-a-Dub-Tub (1983).

Death
King-Smith died on 4 January 2011 at his home near Bath, Somerset at the age of 88. He was survived by his 3 children, 14 grandchildren, 4 great-grandchildren, and 1 great-great-grandchild.

Awards 
King-Smith and The Sheep-Pig won the 1984 Guardian Children's Fiction Prize, a once-in-a-lifetime book award judged by a panel of British children writers.

Works

 The Fox Busters (1978)
 Daggie Dogfoot; US title, Pigs Might Fly (1980)
 Magnus Powermouse (1982)
 The Mouse Butcher (1982)
 The Queen's Nose (1983)
 The Sheep-Pig  (1983); US title, Babe: The Gallant Pig
 Harry's Mad (1984)
 Lightning Fred (1985)
 Saddlebottom (1985)
 Dumpling (1986)
 E.S.P. (1986)
 Noah's Brother (1986)
 The Hodgeheg (1987)
 Tumbleweed (1987)
 Country Watch (1987)
 Town Watch (1987)
 Farmer Bungle Forgets (1987)
 Friends and Brothers (1987)
 Cuckoobush Farm (1987)
 George Speaks (1988)
 Emily's Legs (1988)
 Water Watch (1988)
 Dodo Comes to Tumbledown Farm (1988)
 Tumbledown Farm – The Greatest (1988)
 The Jenius (1988)
 Martin's Mice (1988)
 Sophie
 Sophie's Snail (1988)
 Sophie's Tom (1991)
 Sophie Hits Six (1991)
 Sophie in the Saddle (1993)
 Sophie is Seven (1994)
 Sophie's Lucky (1995)
 Ace (1990)
 Alice and Flower and Foxianna (1989)
 Beware of the Bull (1989)
 The Toby Man (1989)
 Dodos Are Forever (1989)
 The Trouble with Edward (1989)
 Jungle Jingles (1990)
 Blessu (1990)
 Paddy's Pot of Gold (1990)
 Alphabeasts (1990)
 The Water Horse (1990)
 The Whistling Piglet (1990)
 Mrs. Jolly (Series)
 The Jolly Witch (1990)
 Mrs. Jollipop (1996)
 Mrs. Jolly's Brolly (1998)
 The Jolly Witch Trilogy (2000)
 The Cuckoo Child (1991) (illustrated by Leslie W. Bowman)
 The Guard Dog (1991)
 Lightning Strikes Twice (1991)
 Caruso's Cool Cats (1991)
 Dick King-Smith's Triffic Pig Book (1991)
 Find the White Horse (1991)
 Horace and Maurice (1991)
 Lady Daisy (1992)
 Pretty Polly (1992)
 Dick King-Smith's Water Watch (1992)
 The Finger Eater (1992)
 The Ghost at Codlin Castle and Other Stories (1992)
 Super Terrific Pigs (1992)
 The Invisible Dog (1993)
 All Pigs Are Beautiful (1993)
 The Merrythought (1993)
 The Swoose (1993)
 Uncle Bumpo (1993)
 Dragon Boy (1993)
 Horse Pie (1993)
 Connie and Rollo (1994)
 The School Mouse (1994)
 Triffic: A Rare Pig's Tale (1994)
 Mr. Potter's Pet (1994)
 Harriet's Hare (1994)
 The Excitement of Being Ernest (1994)
 I Love Guinea Pigs (1994)
 Three Terrible Trins (1994)
 Happy Mouseday (1994)
 Bobby the Bad (1994)
 The Clockwork Mouse (1995)
 King Max the Last (1995)
 Omnibombulator (1995)
 The Terrible Trains (1995)
 Warlock Watson (1995)
 All Because of Jackson (1995)
 The Stray (1996)
 Clever Duck (1996)
 Dirty Gertie Macintosh (1996)
 Smasher (1996)
 Godhanger (1996)
 Hogsel and Gruntel (1996)
 Treasure Trove (1996)
 Mixed-Up Max (1997)
 What Sadie Saw (1997)
 The Spotty Pig (1997)
 A Mouse Called Wolf (1997)
 Robin Hood and His Miserable Men (1997)(illustrated by John Eastwood)
 Thinderella (1997)
 Puppy Love (1997)
 The Merman (1997)
 Round About 5 (1997)
 Mr. Ape (1998)
 How Green Was My Mouse (1998)
 The Big Pig Book (1998)
 Creepy Creatures Bag (1998)
 The Robber Boy (1998)
 The Crowstarver (1998)
 Pig in the City (1999)
 Poppet (1999)
 The Witch of Blackberry Bottom (1999)
 The Roundhill (2000)
 Spider Sparrow (2000)
 Just in Time (2000)
 The Magic Carpet Slippers (2000)
 Julius Caesar's Goat (2000)
 Mysterious Miss Slade (2000)
 Lady Lollipop (2000)
 The Biography Center (2001)
 Back to Front Benjy (2001)
 The Great Sloth Race (2001)
 Fat Lawrence (2001)
 Funny Frank (2001)
 Chewing the Cud (2001) (autobiography)
 Titus Rules! / Titus Rules OK! (2002)
 Billy the Bird/All Because of Jackson (2002)
 Story Box (2002)
 The Golden Goose (2003)
 Traffic (2003)
 Clever Lollipop (2003)
 The Adventurous Snail (2003)
 The Nine Lives of Aristotle (2003)
 Aristotle (2003)
 Just Binnie (2004)
 The Catlady (2004)
 Under the Mishmash Trees (2005)
 Hairy Hezekiah (2005)
 Dinosaur Trouble (2005)
 Nosy (2005)
 The Mouse Family Robinson (2007)

Adaptations
Harry's Mad (1993–1996): TV series based on Harry's Mad
The Queen's Nose (1995–2003): TV Series based on The Queen's Nose
Babe (1995) and its sequel: film based on The Sheep-Pig
Foxbusters (1999–2000): TV cartoon loosely based on The Fox Busters
The Water Horse: Legend of the Deep (2007): film based on The Water Horse book

References

External links 

 
 Dick King-Smith Bibliography  at Bookseller World
 Dick King-Smith at Fantastic Fiction, with photo portrait and book covers
 
 
 

1922 births
2011 deaths
20th-century British novelists
20th-century English novelists
21st-century British novelists
21st-century English novelists
British Army personnel of World War II
British children's writers
Grenadier Guards soldiers
Guardian Children's Fiction Prize winners
Officers of the Order of the British Empire
People educated at Beaudesert Park School
People educated at Marlborough College
People from Bitton